Riceville may refer to:
Riceville, Indiana
Riceville, Iowa
Riceville, Fulton County, Kentucky
Riceville, Kentucky (Johnson County)
Riceville, Louisiana
Riceville, Maine, a ghost town
Riceville, Montana
Riceville, Pennsylvania
Riceville, Tennessee